Monogorilby is a locality in the North Burnett Region, Queensland, Australia. The neighbourhood of Allies Creek is located in the south-east of Monogorilby.

History 
Monogorilby State School opened on 25 August 1936. It was also known as Monogorilby-Cadaga State School.

In the  Monogorilby had a population of 44 people.

Education 
Monogorilby State School is a government primary (Prep-6) school for boys and girls at 2199 Monogorilby Road. In 2018, the school had an enrolment of 9 students with 1 teachers and 3 non-teaching staff (1 full-time equivalent).

There are no secondary schools in Monogorilby. The nearest secondary schooling is at Mundubbera State School (to Year 10 only) in Mundubbera to the north-west and Burnett State College (to Year 12) in Gayndah to the north-west. Given the distances involved, distance education and boarding school would be other options.

References

Further reading 

 

North Burnett Region
Localities in Queensland